The Herbalist's Manual is a Hong Kong television series released overseas in May 2005 and broadcast on TVB Jade channel in November 2005.

The series focuses on the greatest physician and pharmacologist in Chinese history, Li Shizhen and his herbalist manual, Bencao Gangmu.

Cast
 Note: Some of the characters' names are in Cantonese romanisation.

Viewership ratings

References

External links
TVB.com Herbalist's Manual - Official Website 

TVB dramas
Television series set in the Ming dynasty
2005 Hong Kong television series debuts
2005 Hong Kong television series endings
Television series set in the 16th century